Mark Jenkin (born 1976) is a Cornish director, editor, screenwriter, cinematographer and producer. He wrote and directed the film Bait (2019), which earned him a BAFTA Award for Outstanding Debut by a British Writer, Director or Producer.

Career

Jenkin won the Frank Copplestone First Time Director Award at The Celtic Film & Television Festival in 2002 for his debut film Golden Burn. He followed this success with documentaries, shorts and low-budget feature films including The Man Who Needed a Traffic Light, The Rabbit and  The Lobsterman, a documentary on the life of Cornish playwright Nick Darke. His 2007 feature film The Midnight Drives was described by Derek Malcolm, film critic for The Evening Standard as "A moving film about parentage with an exceptional performance from Colin Holt at its centre".

Jenkin wrote and directed the 2019 drama film Bait, starring his partner Mary Woodvine.

In 2020, Jenkin was recognised as a Cornish Bard for his work in promoting Cornwall’s heritage. In 2022, he created two music videos for the band the Smile.

Filmography

1999 Walking with Dinosaurs – Production Assistant
2002 Golden Burn – Director/Writer/Editor
2003 The Man Who Needed a Traffic Light – Director/Writer/Editor
2004 The Wrecking Season – Editor
2004 The Rabbit – Director/Writer/Editor
2004 New Reed – Cinematographer/Editor
2007 The Lark – Editor
2007 The Midnight Drives – Director/Writer/Editor
2009 Aurora's Kiss (short) – Director/Writer/Editor
2015 Bronco's House (short) - Director/Writer/Editor
2015 Dear Marianne (short) - Director/Writer/Editor
2016 Enough to Fill Up an Egg Cup - Director/Editor/Director of Photography
2016 The Essential Cornishman (short) - Director/Writer/Editor
2016 The Road to Zennor (short) - Director/Writer/Editor
2017 Tomato (short) - Director/Editor
2018 David Bowie Is Dead (short) - Director/Writer/Editor
2019 Bait (film) - Director/Writer/Editor
2022 Enys Men (film) - Director/Writer

References

External links
 

1976 births
Living people
British cinematographers
British documentary filmmakers
British experimental filmmakers
British film directors
British film editors
British film producers
British male screenwriters
People from Newlyn
Outstanding Debut by a British Writer, Director or Producer BAFTA Award winners
Bards of Gorsedh Kernow